Qairat Qydyrbaiūly İşanov (28 September 1950 – 24 November 2022) was a Kazakh politician who served as a Senator for Atyrau Region from 2005 to 2017 and was its Deputy Chair from 24 November 2011.

Biography

Early life and education 
Işçanov was born in the town of Guryev (now Atyrau). In 1980, he graduated from the Satbayev University with a degree in mechanical engineering.

Career 
In 1968, Işçanov became a fisherman of the collective farm Kyzyl Balyk. From 1972 to 1983, he was ship mechanic, civil engineer of the farm until he became an instructor of the Balykshinsky District Committee of the CPC. From 1984, Işçanov was a Chief Engineer of the Qyzyl Balyq until he became the Chairman of the Board of the Kurmangazy collective farm. In 1988, he became the Chairman of the Board of the collective farms 70 years of October and Qyzyl Balyq, and from 1991 to 1994, Işçanov was the Chairman of the Balyksha District Executive Committee, First Deputy Chairman of the Executive Committee, Head of the Balyksha District Administration until he became the Chairman of the Board of the Jambyl Collective Farm, Production Cooperative.

From 1999 to 2000, Işçanov served as a Secretary of Atyrau Region Mäslihat. He then again became the Chairman of Jambyl Collective Farm, Production Cooperative where he worked shortly until he was appointed Deputy Äkim of Atyrau Region in 2001. 

On 19 August 2005, he was elected as member of the Senate of Kazakhstan from Atyrau Region where he served as Chairman of the Finance and Budget Committee and from 2007 served as Chairman of the Committee on Agrarian Issues and Environmental Protection. On 24 November 2011, Işçanov was elected as Deputy Chair of the Senate until he was replaced by Sergey Gromov on 14 January 2016. He continued serving as a Senator until he was succeeded by Gumar Duisembaev on 28 June 2017. Since 20 September 2019, he has been serving as member of the Council of Senators of Kazakhstan.

References 

1950 births
2022 deaths
Communist Party of the Soviet Union members
Nur Otan politicians
Members of the Senate of Kazakhstan
Recipients of the Order of Parasat
Recipients of the Order of Kurmet
People from Atyrau
21st-century Kazakhstani politicians